Daniel Eaton (born March 26, 1992) is an American ice dancer who now represents the Republic of Korea with his partner Yura Min, with whom he is the 2020 Korean National Champion. With former partner Alexandra Aldridge, he is the 2014 Four Continents bronze medalist, a two-time (2012, 2013) World Junior bronze medalist, the 2012 JGP Final bronze medalist, a two-time U.S. national junior champion and the 2010 U.S. national  novice champion.

Early years

Eaton competed on the novice level with Sameena Sheikh at the 2009 U.S. Championships. She retired after the event due to injury.

Partnership with Aldridge

Eaton teamed up with Alexandra Aldridge in May 2009. In their first season together, they won the U.S. novice title. The following season, they debuted on the Junior Grand Prix series, placing 6th and 4th in France and England, respectively. They finished 5th on the junior level at the 2011 U.S. Championships.

During the 2011–12 season, Aldridge/Eaton won bronze in Latvia and silver in Austria on the Junior Grand Prix circuit. They won the junior title at the 2012 U.S. Championships. They competed at the 2012 World Junior Championships and won the bronze medal ahead of Anna Yanovskaya / Sergei Mozgov.

In 2012–13, Aldridge/Eaton won gold medals at their JGP events in Lake Placid, USA and Slovenia. Their results qualified them for the 2012–13 JGP Final in Sochi, Russia, where they won the bronze medal. They won another bronze medal at the 2013 World Junior Championships.

Aldridge/Eaton placed sixth in their senior international debut at the 2013 Ondrej Nepela Trophy and then fifth in their sole GP event, the 2013 Cup of China. They finished 5th at the 2014 U.S. Championships and were assigned to the 2014 Four Continents where they won the bronze medal. Aldridge/Eaton joined the U.S. team to the 2014 World Championships as a result of the withdrawal of Meryl Davis / Charlie White and injury to Madison Hubbell (first alternate with Zachary Donohue). They trained at the Detroit Skating Club in Bloomfield Hills, Michigan, coached by Anjelika Krylova, until the end of the season.

Aldridge/Eaton made a coaching change in July 2014, joining Marina Zueva, Massimo Scali, Johnny Johns, and Oleg Epstein at Canton, Michigan's Arctic Edge. After winning gold at the U.S. Classic, they competed at two Grand Prix events, placing sixth at the 2014 Skate Canada International and seventh at the 2014 Rostelecom Cup. They finished sixth at the 2015 U.S. Championships. They announced the end of their partnership on January 30, 2015.

In August 2017, Aldridge/Eaton resumed training together at the Detroit Skating Club, coached by Krylova and Camerlengo.

Partnership with Thomas

In mid-March 2015, Eaton and Danielle Thomas announced they had formed a partnership, based in Canton, Michigan.

Partnership with Min
On September 22, 2018, Eaton announced a new partnership with South Korean ice dancer Yura Min. Min/Eaton began their partnership competing in several minor competitions, and two Challengers, placing ninth at both the 2019 CS Nebelhorn Trophy and the 2019 CS Golden Spin of Zagreb. After winning the South Korean national title, they placed eighth at the 2020 Four Continents Championships. They were assigned to make their World Championship debut, but the COVID-19 pandemic resulted in that event's cancellation.

Due to Eaton suffering from back problems, Min and Eaton did not compete during the 2020–21 season.

Min/Eaton initially planned to skate their rhythm dance to a medley of Queen songs, but after receiving critiques from judges at the Lake Placid Ice Dance International as to whether it suited the street dance theme, they changed it to a Macklemore theme. They two competed at the 2021 CS Nebelhorn Trophy, seeking to qualify a place for South Korea at the 2022 Winter Olympics, but came seventh at the event and were named only the second reserve.

Programs

With Yura Min

With Thomas

With Aldridge

Competitive highlights 
GP: Grand Prix; CS: Challenger Series; JGP: Junior Grand Prix

With Yura Min for South Korea

With Aldridge

With Thomas

With Sheikh

References

External links 

 
 
 Alexandra Aldridge / Daniel Eaton at IceNetwork
 
 Danielle Thomas / Daniel Eaton at IceNetwork

1992 births
Living people
American male ice dancers
South Korean male ice dancers
People from Titusville, Florida
World Junior Figure Skating Championships medalists
Four Continents Figure Skating Championships medalists